Snake River Correctional Institution (SRCI) is a medium security prison in the western United States in eastern Oregon.

History
The state's prison siting committee selected the Ontario site in October 1989 for a medium security prison that could house up to 3,000 inmates, which Governor Neil Goldschmidt approved later in the month. SRCI opened in August 1991 with 576 medium and 72 minimum security beds.

In 1994, the Oregon Legislature approved a $175 million expansion; built by Hoffman Construction, it was completed in 1998. At the time, it was the largest public works project in the state's history.

Operations
Currently, the prison houses 2,336 medium security beds, 154 minimum security beds, and 510 beds in specialized units such as administrative segregation, disciplinary segregation, intensive management, and the infirmary/hospice. It is staffed by approximately 900 employees.

Among the prison industries housed at Snake River are a commercial call center, a metal shop that manufactures road signs for the state, and a building trades program that manufactures small modular structures such as comfort stations and gatehouses for the state parks.

See also
List of Oregon prisons and jails
Oregon Department of Corrections

References

External links 

 
 ODOC official site

Buildings and structures in Malheur County, Oregon
Prisons in Oregon
1991 establishments in Oregon